The Kabete National Polytechnic is a national university offering technical training in Kenya.
The Kabete technical is located on Waiyaki Way near Uthiru market in Nairobi County. Kabete national polytechnic is known country wide for its best training and performance and considered one of the best technical institution in Kenya This institution was started in 1924 and underwent various revolutionary stages until in 1974 where it was upgraded to a national polytechnic The institute is also accredited by TVET (Technical and Vocational Education and Training).

History
Kabete technical was started in 1924 as a technical school and was later change to a training camp for soldiers during the second world war. The school later changed to a primary school then to a secondary school. In 1972 the school started offering technical education for three year courses and since then the school has developed into one of the best technical universities in Nairobi.

See also
 University of Nairobi
 PC Kinyanjui Technical Training Institute

References

External links
 

Universities and colleges in Kenya